Nicodemus West is a fictional character appearing in American comic books published by Marvel Comics. The character first appeared in The Oath #1 in 2006, as the surgeon who operated on Stephen Strange's hands following his car accident.

Michael Stuhlbarg portrays the character in the Marvel Cinematic Universe film Doctor Strange (2016) and Doctor Strange in the Multiverse of Madness (2022).

Publication history

The character was created by Brian K. Vaughan and Marcos Martin and appears in the limited series, Doctor Strange: The Oath.

Fictional character biography
Nicodemus West was born with heterochromia and spent most of his life studying and practicing medicine and surgery. He was long time admirer of Dr. Stephen Strange, and proudly accepted the opportunity to perform surgery on his idol's hands after his fateful accident. Unfortunately, West was unable to repair the nerves in Strange's hands.

He followed Strange to Kamar-Taj, where he too began training under the Ancient One. Feeling that he could heal people around the world with his new abilities, West leaves his training early, but due to his inexperience accidentally kills a cancer patient. He ends up joining Timely Pharmaceuticals as its C.E.O. under the condition he never use magic.

He eventually reveals himself to Strange when he steals a special elixir that would threaten Timely Pharmaceuticals' business. They fight using their sorcery, but West is easily defeated by Strange. West dies when he temporarily becomes powerless and falls off the Pharmaceuticals building.

In other media
Nicodemus "Nic" West appears in the live-action Marvel Cinematic Universe films Doctor Strange and Doctor Strange in the Multiverse of Madness (2022), portrayed by Michael Stuhlbarg. This version is a rival surgeon to Dr. Stephen Strange who serves as a comedic foil with no sinister intentions.

References

External links
 Nicodemus West at Marvel Wiki

Characters created by Brian K. Vaughan
Comics characters introduced in 2006
Fictional surgeons
Marvel Comics characters who use magic
Marvel Comics male supervillains
Marvel Comics supervillains